Wang Bingzhang may refer to:

 Wang Bingzhang (general) (1914–2005), Chinese general
 Wang Bingzhang (dissident) (born 1947), Chinese dissident